"Sweet Lullaby" is a song by French musical group Deep Forest that originally appeared on their eponymous album (1992). The song gained popularity in 1992 and 1993 when it was released as a single, becoming a top-30 hit in many European and Oceanian countries. In 1994, it was re-released in remixed versions. Its accompanying music video was directed by Tarsem Singh and nominated for several awards at the 1994 MTV Video Music Awards.

Background
The song is based around a traditional Baegu lullaby from the Solomon Islands called "Rorogwela", and uses a vocal sample of a woman called Afunakwa singing, originally recorded by ethnomusicologist Hugo Zemp in 1970 and later released by UNESCO as part of their Musical Sources collection. The lyrics refer to a young orphan being comforted by his older brother despite the loss of their parents.

For a time, Australian television network SBS used the song as its theme. It was also used by German television broadcaster RTL as the closing theme to their coverage of UEFA Champions League football during the 1994–1995 season.

"Sweet Lullaby" uses excerpts from a traditional lullaby of the Baegu and Fateleka ethnic groups of the Solomon Islands, performed by Afunakwa and recorded around 1970 [1] by ethnomusicologist Hugo Zemp in the town of Fulinui [ 2 ] . The lullaby, sung in the Baegu language and called rorogwela, is the song of a young man who asks his younger brother to stop crying and explains that the love of his deceased parents is taking care of them.

Afunakwa's song was included on a 1973 LP titled Solomon Islands: Fateleka and Baegu Music from Malaita published by the UNESCO Music Sources Collection [3]. Only a few verses (marked below in bold) were reused in Sweet Lullaby [4]. Afunakwa's rendition was also reused by Italian disc jockey Mauro Picotto in his song Komodo, and the tune was covered by Norwegian saxophonist Jan Garbarek, in his song erroneously titled Pygmy Lullaby. Afunakwa died during the 1990s [5].

Chart performance
The debut single for the group, "Sweet Lullaby" was a success for Deep Forest, reaching number three in Norway, number seven on the Australian ARIA Charts, number 10 on the British charts, number 78 on the US Billboard Top 100, and the top 20 in France (17), Iceland (11) and Switzerland (15).

Critical reception
In 1994, Larry Flick from Billboard wrote, "This is one of those great projects that has created a long top-shelf life on its own. Now that the 2-year-old "Sweet Lullaby" has finally run its course, Epic is focusing on the act's self-titled track, running it through the remix mill with sterling results. Myriad versions are included to ensure chances for consumption at several formats, ranging from mainstream club to crossover radio." Dave Sholin from the Gavin Report felt it's "haunting and captivating", adding, "It needs more than one listen." Another reviewer, Keith Zimmerman, constated that "with its Pygmy chant samplings, [it] churns out a soulful World Beat groove that's plenty catchy enough to create a mass appeal hit." Chuck Campbell from Knoxville News Sentinel complimented it as a "gorgeous track", "which combines an angelic lead vocal with a sweeping chorus". In his weekly UK chart commentary, James Masterton said, "The musical collage they create is startlingly reminiscent of something One Dove may produce but after much club exposure they have outdone them at a stroke and are destined for the Top 10 next week at least." 

Pan-European magazine Music & Media viewed the song as a "mellow floater". James Hamilton from Music Weeks RM Dance Update described it as an "African chanted haunting Euro hit" and a "exotically atmospheric haunting ethereal drifter". James Hunter from Vibe deemed it "an eager pop confection of continental synths and excellent singing from "the rain forest pygmies of Africa"." Mike Joyce from The Washington Post complimented it as "a dreamy slice of Euro-pop dance music blended together with the haunting voices of a Pygmy chorus and an unidentified female from the Solomon Islands, who implores 'Don't cry, don't cry, your parents are never coming back.'" He added, "Her pinched, plaintive voice is set off by wooden flutelike synth sounds, a programmed drum track, Pygmies chanting in the Central African Baka dialect, and additional vocals. The result is a curious, video-friendly synthesis of ancient and contemporary cultures." 

Music video
The accompanying music video for "Sweet Lullaby", directed by Indian director Tarsem Singh, was also nominated for several awards at the 1994 MTV Video Music Awards. Campbell commented on the video, "Early this year, the evocative video for "Sweet Lullaby" floated into MTV's "Buzz Bin", which helped push the song into Billboards Top 100 singles. Consequently, the album Deep Forest, now almost two years old, has been hitting top stride."

Popular Culture
This music was used in Studio Productions (Flip Your Lid) and Topix's 1993 20th Century Fox Prototype video, which can be seen here (Which is on Archives).

Track listings

 7-inch single "Sweet Lullaby" – 3:54
 "Forest Hymn" (edit) – 3:49

 12-inch maxi "Sweet Lullaby" (nature's dancing mix) – 5:58
 "Sweet Lullaby" (remix) – 6:10
 "Sweet Lullaby" (natural trance mix) – 6:32
 "Sweet Lullaby" (ambient mix) – 3:46

 CD single "Sweet Lullaby" (original mix)
 "Sweet Lullaby" (ambient mix)

 CD maxi "Sweet Lullaby" (original mix) – 3:55
 "Sweet Lullaby" (remix) – 6:08
 "Sweet Lullaby" (nature's dancing mix) – 6:01
 "Sweet Lullaby" (natural trance mix) – 6:32
 "Sweet Lullaby" (ambient mix) – 3:47

 12-inch maxi – Remixes'
 "Sweet Lullaby" (round the world mix) – 6:58
 "Sweet Lullaby" (DJ EFX's tribal as a mofo mix) – 4:40
 "Sweet Lullaby" (the riot mix) – 6:51
 "Sweet Lullaby" (digit's wet dream mix) – 4:25
 "Sweet Lullaby" (Q-bass mix) – 5:57
 "Sweet Lullaby" (the downstream mix) – 5:57
 "Sweet Lullaby" (bonus a la EFX) – 3:08

Charts

Weekly charts

Year-end charts

Certifications

References

External links
 Detailed release information, music samples
 lyrics and translation

1992 debut singles
1992 songs
1993 singles
1994 singles
Columbia Records singles
Dance Pool singles
Deep Forest songs
Epic Records singles
Music videos directed by Tarsem Singh